The French generally accepted accounting principles, called Plan Comptable Général (PCG) is defined by the regulation n°2014-03 written by the Authority of Accounting Rules (Autorité des normes comptables, abbr. ANC), validated by the Minister of the Budget. The Authority of Accounting Rules was created by the ordonnance no 2009-79 and combines the functions of the prior CRC and CNC.

Content 

 Review of the subjects and principles of accountancy;
 Definitions of the main concepts: balance sheet, income statement and annexes, liability and asset, income, loss and profit, and a presentation of accountancy and valuation rules;
 List of account maintenance rules and accounts nomenclature;
 Description of various accounting documentation;
 Summary of special accounting rules.

Accounts classification

References 

France
Accounting in France
Standards of France